HKM Sala is a Slovakian handball team located in Šaľa. Their home matches are played at the Mestská športová Hall. They compete in Extraliga.

Accomplishments

Extraliga: 
Second place (1) : 2017
Third place (1) : 2016

European record

Team

Current squad 

Squad for the 2016–17 season

Goalkeepers
 Vuko Borilovič
 Luděk Fabián
 Peter Repáň
 Marián Žernovič

Wingers
RW
  Miloš Markovič 
  Marián Percze
LW 
  Šimon Michniewicz
  Viktor Szapu
Line players 
  Peter Dudaš
  Tomáš Mažár

Back players
LB
  Vladimír Guzy
  Peter Krokavec
  František Šulc
CB 
  Juraj Janíček
  Patrik Krok 
  Mykola Melnyk 
RB
  Marián Maguška
  Pavol Polakovič

External links

Slovak handball clubs
Sport in Nitra Region